George Andrews may refer to:
George Andrews (adjutant general) (1850–1928), Adjutant General of the U.S. Army from 1912 to 1914
George Andrews (American football) (born 1955), American professional football player during the 1970s and 1980s
George Andrews (barrister) ( 1776), English barrister
George Andrews (footballer) (born 1942), English professional footballer during the 1960s and 1970s
George Andrews (mathematician) (born 1938), American mathematician working in analysis and combinatorics
George Andrews (rugby) (1904–1989), Wales rugby league and international rugby union player
George Grey Andrews (1880–1952), New Zealand yacht designer, racer and naval officer
George H. Andrews (1821–1885), New York politician
George Henry Andrews (1926–1997), Liberian sports journalist and politician
George Lee Andrews (born 1942), American actor
George Leonard Andrews (1828–1899), Union army general of the American Civil War
George Lippitt Andrews (1828–1920), United States Army officer
George "Porky" Andrews (1917–1999), Canadian basketball player
George Rex Andrews (1808–1873), U.S. Representative from New York
George Roberts Andrews (1932–2010), American diplomat
George Townsend Andrews (1804–1855), English architect noted for his railway buildings
George W. Andrews (1906–1971), U.S. Representative from Alabama
George William Andrews (Canadian politician) (1869–1943), Canadian politician and real estate agent
George Reid Andrews, American historian
George Andrews (bishop) (1564–1648), Anglican priest
George Andrews (artist) (1911–1996), American self-taught artist
George Andrews (judge) (1826–1889), Tennessee Supreme Court justice
Augustus George Andrews (1868–1946), known as George Andrews, stage name George Arliss

See also
Kostas Andritsos (1916–1993), aka George Andrews, Greek film director and writer